"Lighters Up" is a single written and recorded by rapper  Lil' Kim appearing as the first single off her fourth album, The Naked Truth. It was produced by her ex-boyfriend, record producer Scott Storch. The song has a similar tone to Damian Marley's Welcome to Jamrock. It was released on July 10, 2005.  The album was originally due to be released September 13, but was delayed until September 27 because Queen Bee Entertainment felt that sales would not hold with the single "Lighters Up". The single debuted at number 100 on the Billboard Hot 100, then quickly climbed up to number 31. The single had a moderate chart performance in the United Kingdom, peaking at number 12 on the UK Singles Chart.

In 2013, the song was voted the best Brooklyn anthem by MTV.

Background 
As the first single from the Naked Truth, the single did reasonably well, creating hype for the album. However, due to the late follow-up, along with little promotions, the single performed less well than previous singles by Lil' Kim. The song is about Kim cautioning people about the dangers and conditions of certain parts of Brooklyn. The video features cameo appearances by Mary J. Blige, Freddie Foxxx, her brother Chris and Maino.

There was also an official remix of the song featuring Tego Calderón. The song featured a new verse and ad-libs from Calderon, as well as a new intro from Kim, but no new verses from Kim. A limited edition CD single featuring this remix was given away with purchases of "The Naked Truth" album exclusively at Target.

The music video of the song starts with the chorus of the clean version of "Shut Up Bitch", which they say "Shut Up, Chick" instead. The video was directed by Kirk Fraser in New York City, peaked at #1 on BET 106 & Park.

Two versions of the song were released. The original, which features cities throughout the US and overseas during the hook, and another version titled "Lighters Up (Welcome To Brooklyn)", which features spots throughout Brooklyn during the hook.

Lauryn Hill wanted to feature on the song but due to label issues it never happened.

Formats and track listings
 UK Promo CD
 "Lighters Up" (Radio Edit) – 3:28
 European Promo CD
 "Lighters Up" (Explicit Version) – 4:26
 "Lighters Up" (Clean Radio Edit) – 3:28
 "My Ni*#@s" (Bonus) – 4:14
 US Promo CD
 Lighters Up (Amended) 4:06
 Lighters Up (Explicit) 4:29
 Lighters Up (Instrumental) 4:30
 Lighters Up (Welcome To Brooklyn) (Amended) 4:30
 Lighters Up (Welcome To Brooklyn) (Explicit) 4:28
 US Remix Promo CD
 "Lighters Up" (Remix) (Radio Version) – 3:44
 "Lighters Up" (Remix) (Explicit Version) – 3:44
 "Lighters Up" (Remix) (Instrumental) – 3:39
 "Lighters Up" (Remix) (Acapella) – 3:44
 Europe CD single
 "Lighters Up" (Album Version) 4:22
 "Lighters Up" (Remix) (Radio Version) – 3:44
 UK CD single
 "Lighters Up" (Album Version) – 4:22
 "Lighters Up" (Edit) – 3:30
 US Remix CD single
 "Lighters Up" (Remix) (featuring Tego Calderon) – 3:44
 Maxi CD
 "Lighters Up" (Radio Edit) (Explicit Version) – 3:28
 "Lighters Up" (Remix) (Explicit Version) – 3:44
 "Lighters Up" (Instrumental) – 3:28
 "Came Back For You" (Non Album Track) – 4:20
 Enhanced Video

Credits and personnel
Credits for "Lighters Up" are taken from the singles liner notes.

Original
Recording
 Recorded at Hit Factory Criteria Recording Studios, Miami, FL & Sony Music Recording Studios, New York, NY
 Recorded by Wayne "The Brain" Allison and Dan The Man,

Personnel
 Vocals by Lil' Kim
 Written by K. Jones, S. Storch
 Produced by Scott Storch
 Bass and Guitar by Aaron Fishbein
 Mixed By Glen Marchese

Remix
Recording
 Recorded at Hit Factory Criteria Recording Studios, Miami, FL & Sony Music Recording Studios, New York, NY
 Recorded by Dan The Man
 Additional Recording at Circle House Studios, Miami, FL by Dominigo Ramon

Personnel
 Vocals by Lil' Kim, Tego Calderon
 Written by K. Jones, S. Storch, V. Carraway, T. Calderon
 Percussion by Ahmir "Questlove" Thompson
 Bass and Guitar by Aaron Fishbein
 Mixed By Glen Marchese
 Additional mixing by Dan The Man

Charts

Weekly charts

Year-end charts

References 

2005 singles
Lil' Kim songs
Tego Calderón songs
Songs about New York City
Song recordings produced by Scott Storch
2005 songs
Songs written by Lil' Kim
Atlantic Records singles
Reggae fusion songs
Songs written by Scott Storch